The Transatlantic Economic Council (TEC) is a body set up between the United States and European Union to direct economic cooperation between the two economies.

Establishment and chairmanship
The TEC was established by an agreement signed on April 30, 2007 at the White House by U.S. President George W. Bush, President of the European Council Angela Merkel (also German Chancellor) and EU Commission President José Manuel Barroso.

The Council is co-chaired by an EU and a U.S. official. Currently, they are US Deputy National Security Advisor for International Economics Daleep Singh and European Commissioner for Trade Valdis Dombrovskis. The Council meets at least once a year, called by the chairs.

Work
The Council is tasked with helping to meet economic partnership objectives and harmonize regulations. Other priorities include: road safety, and petrol conservation, cosmetics testing (finding alternatives to animal testing), technologies, and more cooperation. However the Council has been criticised as getting bogged down in minor details and failing to produce results.

At a TEC meeting on 17 December 2010 in Washington, D.C., the leaders released a U.S.-EU Transatlantic Economic Council Joint Statement committing all parties to deeper transatlantic cooperation on secure trade and supply chain security policies. This was followed by an EU / United States joint statement on supply chain security signed in Brussels on 23 June 2021.

See also
 Transatlantic Free Trade Area
 Transatlantic Trade and Investment Partnership – proposed Free Trade agreement
 United States–European Union relations

References

External links
  Transatlantic Economic Council, United States Department of State
 2010 Transatlantic Economic Council Joint Statement, White House
 Transatlantic Economic Council, European Commission - Enterprise and Industry
 Text of the agreement, White House, 2007-04-30
 FFII: McCreevy wants to legalise Software Patents via a US-EU patent treaty

United States–European Union relations
Organizations related to the European Union
Transatlantic relations